Empire Wyoming was a black community in Eastern Wyoming, near the Nebraska state border, between 1908 and 1920.

It was founded in 1908 by African American families from Custer County, Nebraska.

References

External links
 from article on Empire

Populated places established by African Americans
Unincorporated communities in Wyoming